Doug Taylor (1938–2020) was a Canadian historian, professor, author and connoisseur of movie theatres.  In two books, and multiple online articles, Taylor wrote about Toronto's history of beautiful cinemas. He published a history of selected neighbourhoods in 2010, a book on Toronto lost landmarks in 2018.

Toronto Life magazine and Inside Toronto both profiled Taylor when he published Toronto Theaters and the Golden Age of the Silver Screen.  The Toronto Suns local historian, Mike Filey, used its publication as a jump-off for his own article on Toronto's cinema history.

Taylor's parents immigrated to Canada from Newfoundland, when it was an independent country.  Two of Taylor's books are memoirs of his experience growing up in an immigrant family.

Liz Braun, the Toronto Sun long-term film reviewer endorsed Taylor's books on Toronto cinemas.

Publications

References 

1938 births
2020 deaths
21st-century Canadian historians